Axel Ottosson (born April 19, 1996) is a Swedish ice hockey player. He is currently playing with Färjestad BK of the Swedish Hockey League (SHL).

On November 27, 2014, Ottosson made his Swedish Hockey League debut playing with Modo Hockey during the 2014–15 SHL season.

References

External links

1996 births
Living people
IF Björklöven players
Färjestad BK players
Modo Hockey players
Swedish ice hockey forwards
Timrå IK players
Sportspeople from Umeå